A referendum on the Federation of Arab Republics (Arabic: استفتاء اتحاد الجمهوريات العربية السوري 1971) was held in Syria on 1 September 1971, alongside simultaneous referendums in Egypt and Libya. It was approved by 96.4% of voters, with a turnout of 89.7%.

Results

References

1971 in Syria
1971 referendums
Federation of Arab Republics
Referendums in Syria